Eigil Schwab (28 March 1882 – 4 July 1952) was a Swedish painter. His work was part of the painting event in the art competition at the 1932 Summer Olympics.

References

1882 births
1952 deaths
20th-century Swedish painters
Swedish male painters
Olympic competitors in art competitions
Artists from Stockholm
20th-century Swedish male artists